Hobart Walking Club is a recreational walking club based in Hobart, Tasmania, Australia that was started in 1929 by Jack Thwaites and Evelyn Temple Emmett

It has celebrated stages of its 80 years history in a number of commemorative publications at various milestones: 21 years 50 years and 81 years.

It has published its journal the 'Tasmanian Tramp' since inception, as well as producing maps and other publications over the years.

Considerable effort by members exploring in the South West Tasmania region resulted in photographs and texts explaining access to the many rivers, mountains and tracks of the region, a considerable amount of material appearing in the Tasmanian Tramp.

The organisation has also participated in search and rescue events, as well as promoting safety awareness in bushwalking

A similar club exists in northern Tasmania, the Launceston Walking Club.

Publications
Most publications by the club, apart from the Tasmanian Tramp were short runs or one off publishing ventures.

 The Tasmanian tramp
 Walks programme
 Circular

External links

References

 
Organisations based in Tasmania
1929 establishments in Australia
Hiking in Australia
Hiking organisations in Australia
South West Tasmania